Philip Price may also refer to:

Philip Price (musician), American singer and songwriter
Phillip Price (born 1966), Welsh golfer 
Philip Price (programmer), American computer programmer
Phillip Price Jr. (born 1934), Pennsylvania politician
Phil Price (sculptor) (born 1965), New Zealand sculptor
Phil Price (rugby union) (born 1988), Welsh rugby union player
 Philip Price (c.1945–1972), British soldier killed in  Belfast's Bloody Friday bombings
Phil Price (Canadian football) (born 1949), Canadian football player